Statistics of Austrian first league in the 1928–29 season.

Overview
This was the 18th season of the 1.Liga, and was contested by 12 teams - the top 11 clubs from last season's 1.Liga and SC Nicholson (last season's 2.Liga champions).

League standings

Despite two clubs being relegated, only one club was promoted from 2.Liga (Hakoah Vienna), meaning next season's 1.Liga would feature 11 clubs.

Results

References
Austria - List of final tables (RSSSF)

Austrian Football Bundesliga seasons
Austria
1928–29 in Austrian football